Álvaro Xavier de Castro was Prime Minister of Portugal from 20 November to 30 November 1920 and from 18 December 1923 to 6 July 1924.

Early career
He was born in Guarda, on 9 November 1878. He was part of the Constitutional junta that governed Portugal in 1915. He later served as Governor-General of Mozambique between 1915 and 1918. He was a prominent participant in the attempted coup of January 11, 1919 which took place after the assassination of Sidónio Pais.

Later career
He co-founded the National Reconstitution Republican Party. He was appointed Prime Minister, during a brief period (from 20 November to 30 November 1920). He was replaced by Liberato Pinto, an army officer.

He then joined a new party, the Nationalist Republican Party. He again became Prime Minister of Portugal, from 18 December 1923 to 6 July 1924. He died in Coimbra on 29 June 1928.

References

1878 births
1928 deaths
People from Guarda, Portugal
Portuguese republicans
Prime Ministers of Portugal
Finance ministers of Portugal
Portuguese expatriates in Mozambique
Governors-General of Mozambique
Government ministers of Portugal
19th-century Portuguese people